The Berkeley Journal of International Law is an academic journal covering international law. It is run and edited by students at UC Berkeley School of Law. It was established in 1982 as the International Tax & Business Lawyer.

The journal publishes articles on public and private international law and comparative law. It also publishes reviews of new books in the field.

, the Berkeley Journal of International Law was the 26th most cited international law journal in the United States, according to the W&L Law Journal Rankings.

The journal publishes two issues per year and on its website also publishes the Publicist, "an online-only journal that allows for faster publication of ideas in a shorter and more accessible format than the traditional printed Law Review."

The journal hosts the Stefan A. Riesenfeld Symposium, where scholars and practitioners address important international legal issues.

References

External links 
 

International law journals
Biannual journals
English-language journals
Publications established in 1982
University of California, Berkeley
Law in the San Francisco Bay Area
Online-only journals
1982 establishments in California
Law journals edited by students